While 1710 kHz appears on many radios, it is outside the AM broadcast band and is unavailable for licensed radio operation. This is because aeronautical radio navigation may use 1708 kHz. 

Travelers' information station WQFG689 is the lone station licensed on 1710; it is licensed to the government of Hudson County, New Jersey. 

In Canada, CHIM-FM claims to operate at 1710 kHz in Timmins, Ontario. 
There may be other radio stations that also use this frequency for tourist information, traffic, LPAM, unlicensed pirate radio stations, or temporarily for special events. 
In 2010, an unlicensed radio station in Portland, Oregon reportedly used this frequency.

References

External links

Lists of radio stations by frequency
1710